Kohima Lotha Baptist Church is a Baptist church located in the locality of Lower Chandmari Ward, Kohima, Nagaland, India. The church building was opened in 2017, although the congregation had been formed since 1956. It is one of the biggest Lotha Baptist churches in Nagaland and also the main church building of the Lotha Nagas in Kohima city.

History
The Kohima Lotha Baptist Church was established on 4 March 1956. The old church building was demolished in 2011 and a new building was constructed in 2017. Today the church has a total membership of 2406 with 7 sectoral fellowships across the city.

Architecture
The four floored building has a 3000 seating capacity with two floors in the basement for vehicular parking. It was built at a cost of  ₹   1,63,65,000. Hutoshe Awomi as the Chief Engineer and Nungsangwati as the Chief Architect.

See also
 Christianity in Nagaland

References

External links 

 Kohima Lotha Baptist Church Official Website
 Kohima Lotha Baptist Church on YouTube
Kohima
Churches completed in 2017
Churches in Nagaland
Buildings and structures in Kohima
2017 establishments in Nagaland
Baptist churches in India